William Henry Wilson (December 6, 1877 – August 11, 1937) was a Republican lawyer and member of the United States House of Representatives from Pennsylvania.

Early life and career
William H. Wilson was born in Philadelphia, Pennsylvania on December 6, 1877.  He graduated from the law department of the University of Pennsylvania in 1898 and was subsequently admitted to the bar in 1899. Wilson's first foray into politics was his tenure as assistant city solicitor from 1900 to 1909.  He was then elected to two terms in the Pennsylvania House of Representatives and served from 1913 until his resignation on December 28, 1915. He served as director of public safety in Philadelphia from 1916 to 1920.

Wilson married Florence Klauder in 1902, and they had their only child, Dorthea, in 1905.

By 1930, Wilson had moved to Atlantic City, New Jersey with his wife and daughter. However, he moved back to Philadelphia and then ran for Congress in 1934.

Congress
Wilson was elected to Congress in 1934, defeating Democrat James P. McGranery. The seat was open because its previous representative, Republican James M. Beck, resigned in protest of the New Deal. However, two years later, McGranery ran again and defeated Wilson, riding off the coattails of the very popular Franklin D. Roosevelt.

In Congress, Wilson cast 173 votes. During those votes, Wilson sided with his party 91 percent of the time, noticeably higher than his party's average during that Congress of 87 percent. He was rated as more conservative than 96 percent of the 74th Congress at-large, and more conservative than 87 percent of fellow Republicans in the House. Despite his conservatism, he voted for the Social Security Act of 1935, likely the most consequential vote of his legislative career.

Wilson had one committee assignment during his term, the House Committee on Coinage, Weights, and Measures.

Later life and death
After leaving Congress in 1937, Wilson returned to practicing law. Later that year, he moved to Montecito, California, where he planned to build a new home. However, before the house was built, he had a sudden heart attack, passing away at age 59.

Wilson was interred at Forest Lawn Memorial Park in Glendale, California.

Electoral history

|+ Pennsylvania's 2nd congressional district: Results 1934-1936
! Year
!
! Subject
! Party
! Votes
! %
!
! Opponent
! Party
! Votes
! %
|-
|1934
||
| |William H. Wilson
| |Republican
| |44,478
| |54.71
||
| |James P. McGranery
| |Democratic
| |36,212
| |44.55
|-
|1936
||
| |William H. Wilson (inc.)
| |Republican
| |41,267
| |37.53
||
| |James P. McGranery
| |Democratic
| |65,779
| |59.82

References

1877 births
1937 deaths
Politicians from Philadelphia
University of Pennsylvania Law School alumni
Republican Party members of the Pennsylvania House of Representatives
Republican Party members of the United States House of Representatives from Pennsylvania